is a survival horror video game co-produced by Capcom and Sunsoft for the PlayStation 2. Released in 2002, it is the fourth installment in the Clock Tower series, and the first and only video game directed by Japanese film director Kinji Fukasaku. The plot and characters have very little relation with the previous Clock Tower games. The story follows 14-year-old Alyssa Hamilton who is part of a family lineage of female warriors who travel through time to defeat evil spirits. Alyssa travels from her time in 2003 London to the 1940s and 1960s in order to defeat these "Entities" and bring peace to troubled souls.

As opposed to the point-and-click gameplay used in the previous games, Clock Tower 3 is the first game in the series to incorporate direct control over the protagonist. Alyssa is given no weapon for the majority of the game, and must evade and hide from her pursuers. These enemies, known as "Subordinates", are fought at the end of each level, during which Alyssa is armed with a longbow. The game received mixed reviews and was a commercial failure, selling considerably less than anticipated. The presentation, writing, and graphics were positively received, with many critics praising the cutscenes and Fukasaku's direction. However, the gameplay was criticized for its repetitive mechanics, and the game itself was felt to be too short.

Gameplay
Clock Tower 3 is a survival horror game played from a fixed third-person camera perspective in which players control 14-year-old school girl Alyssa Hamilton. Clock Tower 3 is the first game in the series to incorporate direct control over the protagonist, as opposed to the point-and-click gameplay used in the previous games. To progress through the game, the player must find items to unlock new areas, solve puzzles, and flee and hide from enemies ("Subordinates"). Eventually, each Subordinate must be defeated in battle. Throughout each level, the player also encounters the spirits of innocent people slain by the Subordinates. These spirits will attack Alyssa if she approaches them. In order to pacify them, an item of sentimental value must be found and returned to the spirit's corpse.

Alyssa is given no weaponry during the majority of the game, other than a limited supply of holy water, which can be used to temporarily stun pursuing Subordinates. Within each level, the Subordinate can appear in any location after a set period of time, but also randomly or if Alyssa makes noise. They also appear in certain set locations. When one appears, it immediately begins to chase Alyssa, attempting to kill her. The player must either hide from or evade it. Evasion can only be accomplished in certain places, and each evasion point can only be used once. Using an evasion point does not kill the Subordinate, but instead renders them unconscious for a set amount of time. The primary means of eluding one, however, is by hiding. There are multiple hiding points throughout each level, and each one can be used multiple times. However, hiding places are ineffective if the Subordinate sees Alyssa enter them.

Throughout most of the game, Alyssa has a "Panic Meter" visible on screen. If she is scared by a Subordinate, attacked by a spirit or simply frightened by her surroundings, the meter will begin to rise. If it fills, she enters "Panic mode". In this state, the screen starts flashing, Alyssa becomes difficult to control and begins stumbling and falling over. She is also unable to use holy water and cannot enter hiding spots. After a few seconds, she will momentarily freeze, covering her ears. Panic mode only lasts for a certain amount of time, and its duration can be reduced by using "Lavender water". However, if she is hit by a Subordinate while in Panic Mode, she will die instantly.

After the majority of each level has played out, Alyssa must confront the Subordinate who has been chasing her. At this point, her holy water bottle transforms into a longbow, allowing her to fight back. Each battle is confined to a single area, and both Alyssa and the Subordinate have onscreen life bars. During the fight, Alyssa must dodge attacks while firing arrows. In order to inflict any real damage, she must power-up her attacks. However, while powering-up, Alyssa cannot move or re-adjust her aim. This leaves her vulnerable to attacks, and makes it possible for her enemy to move out of her line of sight. A fully powered-up shot will tether the Subordinate to the ground. If it is transfixed with multiple powered-up shots, Alyssa can perform a highly damaging "Super attack", killing or severely wounding it.

Plot
The story of Clock Tower 3 is set in London in 2003. Alyssa Hamilton is a 14-year-old girl who has been living at a boarding school for three years. Her mother, Nancy, sent her there after her grandfather, Dick, disappeared. The game begins with Alyssa receiving a letter from her mother telling her to go into hiding until after her fifteenth birthday. Alarmed, Alyssa decides to go against her mother's wishes and return home. When she arrives at the boarding house in which they live, her mother is absent, and the only person there is a man called "The Dark Gentleman". Determined to find her mother, Alyssa explores her mother's room. Suddenly, Frédéric Chopin's Fantaisie-Impromptu begins to play with no apparent source, and Alyssa is transported back in time to the streets of London during World War II.

She enters a tailor shop where she witnesses the murder of a young girl by a man wielding a sledgehammer. Eventually, Alyssa is able to piece together what happened: May Norton was killed on Christmas Eve 1942 by Sledgehammer, a stonecutter who went on a killing spree before being caught and executed. Alyssa comes to realise that she must free May's spirit, which is trapped on Earth, by giving her her father's pocket watch. On her way to do so, she is confronted by Sledgehammer, whom she destroys. She then gives the watch to May's spirit, reuniting her with her father. At that moment, Alyssa faints and wakes up back in the boarding house. She explores the house further with her friend, Dennis Owen, and learns more about her past: the girls in her family are known as "Rooders", young women with supernatural powers. Rooders are the sworn enemies of "Entities", beings which can infect innocent humans and drive them to acts of murder, at which point the human becomes a "Subordinate". Rooder powers peak at the age of fifteen, and wane afterward, disappearing completely by the age of twenty.

Alyssa then travels to the 1960s, where she enters the house of Dorothy Rand, a blind elderly woman and her son, Albert, and sees them murdered by a man known as Corroder, who throws them into a vat of acid. Alyssa destroys Corroder, and returns a lost shawl to Dorothy's spirit, freeing both herself and Albert. She then returns to the present, where The Dark Gentleman congratulates her on killing two Subordinates. He sends her to the top of a massive clock tower where he tells her that when her fifteenth birthday arrives they will be united for eternity. He also tells her that her mother is dead. When she refuses to believe him, he flings her from the tower. Regaining consciousness in a sewer system, she is forced to confront another Subordinate, Chopper. She defeats him, but fails to kill him and is sent to a graveyard. She then learns of the "Ritual of Engagement"; if a human wishes to become an Entity, they must remove the heart of a Rooder to whom they are related on her fifteenth birthday and drink her blood. Eventually, Alyssa fights Chopper again and is able to destroy him.

Dennis arrives, and he and Alyssa find their way to an abandoned hospital where they encounter Scissorman and Scissorwoman, who kidnap Dennis. Alyssa is then transported to a castle, where she sees Dick reciting a strange incantation. She learns Dick knew of the Ritual of Engagement, and had discovered that Lord Burroughs, the owner of the castle and from whom he is descended, also knew of the ritual. She then sees an incident from the past of Dick asking for Burroughs' help to become an Entity, inviting Burroughs to enter his body and for them to complete the Ritual together. Burroughs' spirit takes possession of Dick, turning into The Dark Gentleman. Meanwhile, Alyssa is able to rescue Dennis from the twins, killing them in the process. The Dark Gentleman then tells Alyssa if she wants to save Nancy's soul, she must come to the top of the tower. There, The Dark Gentlemen turns into Lord Burroughs and begins the Ritual. However, Dennis distracts Burroughs, allowing Alyssa to fight back. Nancy's spirit transfers what is left of her own Rooder power into Alyssa, giving her the strength to destroy Burroughs. After she defeats him, she reunites with her mother's spirit. The tower then collapses. Alyssa awakens in a field, where she sees Dennis. She runs to him and hugs him as she says "Mum...we did it. We did it, Mum".

Development
After Human Entertainment went out of business in 2000, Sunsoft became the sole owner of the Clock Tower intellectual property. In April 2001, Capcom announced to bring Clock Tower 3 to the PlayStation 2 and co-producing the game with Sunsoft. Japanese film director Kinji Fukasaku directed the cutscenes, Keita Amemiya was in charge of character designs, Noboru Sugimura was writing the scenario, and Kouji 'Cozy' Kubo was composing the music. At the time of the announcement, the game was still in the casting phase; over two hundred actresses had auditioned for the motion capture of Alyssa. The game was first shown at E3 in May 2002, where a non-playable demo was on show at the Capcom booth.

Release 
Clock Tower 3 was released in Japan on December 12, 2002. Commercially, the game was a failure. Capcom had projected sales of at least 450,000, but the game fell considerably short of that number. By the end of 2002, it had sold 78,961 units, making it the 151st highest selling game in Japan across all systems. In 2003, it sold a further 43,061 units, bringing its total to only 122,022 units sold.

Reception

Clock Tower 3 received "mixed or average reviews", with an aggregate score of 69 out of 100 on Metacritic, based on 28 reviews.

The game's presentation was strongly praised, with many pointing out the excellent cinematic style brought together by a strong script and well-directed cutscenes. GameSpy's Alan Pavlacka felt the script was the game's strongest point, and wrote that the "excellent cinema scenes" and "distinct visual style" also contributed to the high quality presentation. The graphics and atmosphere were also well received. IGN's Jeremy Dunham noted that "Clock Tower 3 successfully captur[es] the dirty, musty look of England's serial killer underworld...[it] is straight out of a Mary Shelley novel". The cutscene direction from Kinji Fukasaku was positively noted, with Eurogamer Kristan Reed calling the cutscenes "exceptionally well-realised". The camerawork and scariness of the game were both lauded and criticized.

While the presentation was received positively, the gameplay received criticism from multiple reviews.  More specifically, the boss fights and repetitive hiding and chasing gameplay mechanics were cited as weak. GameSpot Brad Shoemaker argued the cinematic portions were underpinned by the gameplay, believing that players would more likely want to finish the game for its storyline than the fun they'll have playing it. Game Revolution's AA White wrote that "Clock Tower 3 is ultimately one of those games whose cinemas are more interesting than the actual gameplay and from a gamer's standpoint, that's never a good thing". Critics also agreed that the game felt too short.

Notes

References

2002 video games
Capcom games
Clock Tower 3
Video games about ghosts
PlayStation 2 games
PlayStation 2-only games
Psychological horror games
Single-player video games
Sunsoft games
Video games about time travel
Video games developed in Japan
Video games featuring female protagonists
Video games set in 2003
Video games set in castles
Video games set in London
Video games set in the 20th century